Fairview Park is a  park located in Seattle, Washington, on the eastern shoreline of Lake Union along Fairview Avenue E. between E. Hamlin and Allison Streets. It includes a P-Patch and a boat launch.

External links

Cascade, Seattle
Parks in Seattle